William Wesley Mitchell, Sr. (October 10, 1880 – April 30, 1969) was an American politician and businessman.

Born in Vienna, Illinois, Mitchell moved to Arizona Territory in 1910. He was publisher of the Mesa Free Press and was in the land development business. He served in the Arizona House of Representatives from 1937 to 1958, representing the Maricopa=11 (Phoenix) district and Maricopa-05 (Tempe) district. He died in Tempe, Arizona.

References

1880 births
1969 deaths
People from Vienna, Illinois
Politicians from Tempe, Arizona
Businesspeople from Arizona
Members of the Arizona House of Representatives
20th-century American politicians
20th-century American businesspeople